The 1964 Bolivian Primera División, the first division of Bolivian football (soccer), was played by 8 teams. The champion was The Strongest.

La Paz Group

External links
 Official website of the LFPB 

Bolivian Primera División seasons
Bolivia
1964 in Bolivian sport